William Davis Ardagh (March 21, 1828 – April 16, 1893)  was an Ontario lawyer, judge and political figure. He represented Simcoe North in the Legislative Assembly of Ontario from 1871 to 1874.

He was born in County Tipperary in Ireland in 1828 and grew up in County Kilkenny. He came to Barrie in Canada West in 1848, articled in law and was called to the bar in 1855. He entered the practice of law in Toronto with John Willoughby Crawford. He served as deputy judge in Simcoe County in 1882 and was reeve and later mayor of Barrie. He moved to Winnipeg, Manitoba, where he served as Deputy Attorney-General and County Court judge. He also served on the Board of Police Commissioners for Winnipeg.

He died in Hoboken, New Jersey in 1893.

External links 

Manitoba Historical Society

1828 births
1893 deaths
19th-century Irish people
Immigrants to the Province of Canada
Irish emigrants to pre-Confederation Ontario
Judges in Manitoba
Judges in Ontario
Lawyers in Ontario
Mayors of Barrie
Politicians from County Kilkenny
Politicians from County Tipperary
Progressive Conservative Party of Ontario MPPs